Colegio Italiano Leonardo da Vinci is an Italian international school in La Calleja, Bogotá, Colombia.

Named after Leonardo da Vinci, it has scuola infanzia (preschool) through secondaria II grado (liceo) (upper secondary school).

References

External links
  Colegio Italiano Leonardo da Vinci
 https://uncoli.edu.co/colegios-asociados/

International schools in Bogotá
Italian international schools in Colombia